Christine (formerly, Guntleys) is a former settlement in Mendocino County, California.

A post office operated at Christine from 1874 to 1912, with a closure during part of 1910. The original white settlers were a set of Swiss families, one of which was surnamed Guntley, another had a daughter with the name Christine, after whom the town was named.

References

Former settlements in Mendocino County, California
Former populated places in California